Harry Flemming (1933 – 16 February 2008) was a Nova Scotian journalist focused on politics.  He was also an unsuccessful candidate for the Liberal Party of Canada in the 1968 Canadian federal election.

Born in Boston, Flemming was raised in Truro and went on to graduate from Mount Allison University and Dalhousie Law School.  Involved in politics throughout his life, he tried his hand at politics directly for the first time at age 34 by running for Parliament for the Liberals in the strongly Conservative riding of Cumberland-Colchester North, losing to Progressive Conservative Party of Canada candidate Robert Coates 18,446 votes to 10,139.

Flemming was a well-known journalistic political commentator, for years with the former Halifax Daily News and on television for Canadian Broadcasting Corporation on CBHT's supper hour news show First Edition (with Parker Barss Donham) between 1986 and 1995.

Flemming died on February 16, 2008, of complications from cancer and pneumonia.

References

American emigrants to Canada
Canadian political commentators
CBC Television people
Mount Allison University alumni
Schulich School of Law alumni
Deaths from lung cancer
Deaths from pneumonia in Canada
Journalists from Nova Scotia
Candidates in the 1968 Canadian federal election
Nova Scotia candidates for Member of Parliament
People from Boston
People from Truro, Nova Scotia
1933 births
2008 deaths
Liberal Party of Canada candidates for the Canadian House of Commons